Bernard Frize (born 1949, Saint-Mandé, France) is a French painter who works in a variety of materials and utilizes a multitude of techniques. As an artist he explores the bare minimal essence of painting, devoid of conception and aesthetic, instead focusing on an industrial approach to making art. His work is highly process-oriented, often requiring unconventional tools, materials, and the assistance of others to complete a painting.

Frize looks at a painting as a search for an agreement between "nature", a viewer and a flat surface. He states at an interview with Jane Peterson, a journalist, "This is what my paintings are about and why they are not about the process. Nevertheless, the process is a way of engaging the viewer in a kind of simultaneity."

Frize's artworks have been exhibited extensively across Europe (Centre Pompidou in 2019) and the UK (Ikon Gallery in Birmingham, as one example), as well as recently in the United States. He is represented by the Galerie Emmanuel Perrotin in Paris and Miami, Simon Lee Gallery in London and Galerie Nächst St. Stephan in Vienna.

Frize lives and works in Paris, France as well as Berlin, Germany.

References

External links
Bernard Frize website
Frize on Artnet
2004 Los Angeles exhibition
Galerie Perrotin
Bernard Frize: Faces et Profils
Patrick Painter
Simon Lee Gallery, London.
Galerie nächst St. Stephan Rosemarie Schwarzwälder
Art Plural: Voices of Contemporary Art

French mixed-media artists
20th-century French painters
20th-century French male artists
French male painters
21st-century French painters
21st-century French male artists
Living people
1954 births
French contemporary artists